The D-442 FUG (Felderítő Úszó Gépkocsi – "amphibious reconnaissance vehicle") and D-944 PSZH (Páncélozott Személyszállító Harcjármű – "armored personnel carrier") are the  results of Hungarian domestic development of relatively cheap amphibious armoured scout car and armored personnel carrier series. FUG and PSZH were exported with limited success, thus it is also known under its Czechoslovak designation OT-65.

Development and description 
Due to the similarities with the Soviet BRDM-1 armoured scout car, D-442 FUG is often misinterpreted as a BRDM-1 modification. Although FUG has similar appearance to the BRDM-1, major differences reflect the independent design.

The Hungarian military leadership had abandoned the promising domestic recon armored car project based on WW2-era Csaba, because the Soviet government promised to sell large numbers of old BA-64s from Soviet reserves at a low price. Hungary never received any BAs, thus Hungarian People's Army had no wheeled armoured reconnaissance vehicle from 1945 to 1960s. The desperate need of suitable recon vehicles and the insufficient performance of the Soviet industry (persistent shortage of APCs and Recon cars) encouraged the Hungarian industry to develop and mass-produce a cheap but capable enough recon vehicle. In order to speed up development and keep prices down, Hungarian industry largely based the design on parts of existing civilian vehicles and boat-manufacturing experience of the Hungarian shipyards.

The hull was designed by the Danube Shipyard in order to maximize buoyancy optimized for crossing rivers (better than BRDM), thus D-442 has a much more angular shape than the BRDM-1's boat-like hull, and it has two waterjets for amphibious propulsion instead of one as in BDRM-1. The powertrain was almost completely of domestic design. The engine, winch and rear axle came from Csepel D-344 trucks, front suspension was based on an modified Ikarus design, the transmission and the unique transfer system were designed by Rába, but the belly wheels were the same as the system of BRDM-1. Unlike the BRDM-1 which had a conventional 4x4 vehicle layout, the FUG is more similar to BRDM-2, with the engine compartment in the rear and the crew compartment in the front and center. The transmission is located in the middle; this made the crew compartment noisy, but facilitates maintenance compared to BRDM.

FUG had light armor, 13 millimeters at front and 7 mm at sides and rear. During production every plate was shot (using AK-47 and PK) in order to control the quality, and the traces of this testing are visible on vehicles. The armour on the vehicle was welded rolled homogenous steel. The 7–13 mm thick plates protect against small arms fire and small shell fragments, but a .50-calibre machine gun can penetrate D-442 FUG. However, mine-protection was acceptable because there were very few penetration points at the bottom of the body. Therefore, the front axle had external fastening points rather than screws through the belly plate, and only the steering rod penetrated the armor.

The development of the domestic-designed small turret with anti-tank rocket-launcher and PKT were abandoned for political reasons. The turret was highly similar to the one on OT-62B, but with significantly lower silhouette. Therefore, the major drawback of D-442 FUG was the lack of permanent armament, and lack of firing ports was later considered a major design flaw. To operate the pintle-mounted 7.62 mm light machine gun in the front, the soldier had to expose himself to enemy fire.

The vehicle shares characteristics with both BRDM-1 and BRDM-2. Like the first standard version it has no permanent armament. As in BRDM-1 and BRDM-2, the commander and the driver were sited in the front of the hull, driver on the left and commander on the right. Also as on both the BRDM-1 and the BRDM-2, the D-442 FUG has four infra-red driving lights in the front. The other similarities with the BRDM-1 include the windshields which in combat situation are replaced by armoured shutters with integral vision blocks and two firing ports on both sides of the troop compartment. However, to use the armoured shutters the windshields have to be removed. When the shutters are in their opened position they protect the driver and commander from being blinded by the sunlight, and ensure that the windscreens will not be blurred by rain or snow. Both driver and commander can use episcopes to view the battlefield instead of the windshields.

The D-442 FUG has a roof with two hatches over commander's and driver's stations.
While the BRDM-1 and BRDM-2 only had hatches on top of the roof, the D-442 FUG has a round escape hatch in the floor.
The vehicle is powered by a Hungarian-made Csepel six-cylinder diesel engine. The exhaust is located on the right hand side of the hull. The vehicle is equipped with a winch, intended, among others, for self-recovery when stuck in difficult terrain. To improve cross-country capability, central tire-pressure regulation system can also be used to decrease the pressure in all tires before crossing an obstacle and to increase it to the required level after the obstacle has been crossed. The tire pressure can be reduced and controlled by the driver from his post by the means of valves and a pressure indicator. Like the BDRM-1 and BRDM-2, it has four auxiliary belly wheels which the driver can hydraulically lower to assist the vehicle in crossing obstacles and gaps. Speed is sacrificed in this mode of travel, which is accomplished in first gear at a speed of five to eight kilometers per hour.
Water obstacles can be crossed by swimming. In water, the vehicle is driven by two water jets controlled by the driver which are steered by reversing the thrust. Stability of the vehicle in water is improved by a trim board which is erected at the front before entering the water. While in its traveling position it serves as additional armour.

It is primarily intended for reconnaissance activities, particularly behind the enemy lines. It was converted to be used in a variety of different roles such as an artillery observation post, a mobile command/observation post and NBC reconnaissance. The Hungarian FÚG version can be fitted with a pintle-mounted RPD LMG, but on the OT-65 the main weapon was a 7.62 UK (vz. 59) general purpose machine gun with electromagnetic release.

Development of PSZH 
The drawbacks of FUG, and the lack of modern APCs in Warsaw Pact caused the planning of D-944 PSZH developed in late 1960s. The PSZH was designed as the main armoured personnel carrier of the Hungarian Armed Forces, border guard and internal security services too. The vehicle had a small two-part side door (in cost of auxiliary belly wheels) on both sides of the hull. The PSZH had a turret armed with 14.5 mm KPVT heavy machine gun and 7.62 mm coaxial general purpose machine gun with thin, but sloped armor. Both weapons can be elevated between -5 and +30 degrees. The turret has two IR spotlights, one next to the armament and the second one on top of the turret. It also has a radio antenna on back of the turret. Like in the BRDM-2 there two hatches over driver's and commander's stations in the front of the turret. Contrary to the popular belief the turret used in D-944 PSZH is significantly different from the BPU-1 turret used in BRDM-2, PSZH had better ergonomics and observation.

PSZH had similar layout to FÚG, but it carried 6 troops and crew consisted of 3 men. Commander and driver sat at the front, gunner was in the turret, while carried soldiers sat on sides of hull in the place of belly wheels of FÚG. The last troop on both sides had internal radio and can observe rearwards and side. Middle men on each side sat just inside the door and they can use their weapons if the upper part of the door is open.

D-944 PSzH had slightly better protection with maximum armour of 14 millimeters. The vehicle also introduced NBC protection system and infrared night-vision equipment. Even though the D-944 PSZH resembles the BRDM-2, it does not have the flaw related to entering and exiting the vehicle (See BRDM-2 for details) which is present in D-442 FÚG, because the vehicle has side hatches as opposed to the front roof hatches. Because the vehicle uses an only slightly modified hull of D-442 FÚG it also has the round escape hatch in the floor. The buoyancy were improved slightly, but this was necessary because of the weight of the turret.

Service history 
FÚG armoured scout cars were serving with armies of six Warsaw Pact countries: Hungary, Czechoslovakia, Poland, Bulgaria, East Germany and Romania. Poland received small numbers of FÚG armoured scout cars in reconnaissance, command, artillery forward observation post and NBC reconnaissance versions in 1965. Those were probably Czechoslovak OT-65 Otter versions. They were withdrawn from military service in 1980s. After that it was used by internal protection units. No longer in any kind of service. Three were given to museums. Some were given to the proving grounds as targets after they were stripped of all equipment.
Hungary also developed the PSzH-IV armored personnel carrier from the D-944 PSzH armoured scout car. The PSzH-IV prototype first appeared in 1966 and only took part in a single maneuver parade in Bratislava, mounting an egg-shaped turret and dummy automatic cannon. The prototype and the PSzH-IV were first thought to be an armoured scout cars by the West due to its small size and 4x4 configuration, and thus called  FÚG-66 and FÚG-70 after the FÚG 4x4 scout car.

The PSzH-IV is no longer in service with Hungary. However the armoured cars are still in stock. Czechoslovakia sold its OT-65 vehicles to Iraq. Iraq also bought the PSzH-IV APC. The vehicles were probably used during the Iran-Iraq War, Persian Gulf War and the 2003 invasion of Iraq by the Iraqi Army.

Variants

Hungary 

 D-442.00 FÚG (early 1960s) - Basic armoured scout car without the turret. It had an R-113 or R-114 radio.
 D-442.01 PK-FÚG (parancsnoki) - Converted into a command vehicle with R-113 or R-114 and  an additional R-114M or R-112 radio for platoon and company commanders. Later a R-403 or R-407 relay was built in for company and battalion commanders.
 D-442.03 VS-FÚG (vegyi sugárfelderítö úszó gépkocsi) - NBC reconnaissance vehicle based on D-442 FÚG with specialized radiation, chemical and biological detection devices as well as flag dispensers used to mark the contaminated areas.
 D-442.01 MRP-FÚG (páncélozott repülőirányító pont) - Forward air controller post, based on D-442 PK-FÚG with an R-114 and an R-159 radio.
 D-442.02 MÜ-FÚG (műszaki) - Engineer reconnaissance vehicle with special equipment.
 FÚG-66 (1966) - Four prototypes built for D-944 PSzH without turret in 1966.
 FÚG-70 (1970) - Pre-series built prototypes for D-944 PSzH (Wheeled Amphibious Armoured Personnel Carrier) able to carry six fully equipped soldiers, who exit the vehicle through small two-part doors on the each side of the hull. The turret was different from the D-944.00. The main weapon was a 20mm caliber aircraft machine cannon, cannibalized from Il-10 aircraft in the middle 1950s. Only 7 were built.

PSZH APC 

 D-944.00 PSZH (1970–1979) - Armoured personnel carrier with a small two part side door on both sides of the hull and a turret armed with 14.5 mm KPVT heavy machine gun and 7.62 mm KGKT coaxial general purpose machine gun. Both weapons can be elevated between -5 and +30 degrees and for aiming there was a KM-1 sight. The turret has two TVN-2 IR spotlights, one next to the armament and the second one on top of the turret. It also has a radio antenna on back of the turret for the R-113 radio and a R-142 phonia. Like in the BRDM-2 there two hatches over driver's and commander's stations in the front of the turret. The motor was a 100HP D-414.44 diesel.
 PSZH 6x6: Three-axis redesignation. One full size functioning prototype was built and tested.
 PSZH-2: Four-axis redesignation of the PSZH with a complete BMP-1 turret mounted with a 73 mm 2A28 Grom main armament. No prototype was built.
 D-944.00M PSzH-M (1988) - Rebuilt original D-944.00 with an R-123 radio and a PKT machine gun instead of the old KGKT. The motor was a 110 hp D-414.44/2 diesel.
 D-944.00 PSZH-F - Armoured personnel carrier for reconnaissance platoons and companies.
 D-944.77 PSZH - Armoured personnel carrier for the Hungarian border guard and internal security police troops. It was developed from the basic APC version with minor changes and it had a turret, unlike the German PSZH-IV-10.
 D-944.31 SZDPK-PSZH - Command vehicle for mechanized company commanders, based on D-944.00 PSzH with two R-123 radios and an antenna. It has an additional R-107 radio in the troop compartment. In there was only two place for personnel, one for the radiomen and one place plus a map-desk for the commander.
 D-944.21 ZPK-PSZH (zászlóaljparancsnoki) - Command vehicle for mechanized battalion commanders and for reconnaissance company commanders, based on D-944 PSzH with additional radios and additional radio antenna on right hand side of the hull. It has two R-123 and one R-130 radios, plus two additional R-107 in the troop compartment.
 D-944.22 ZTÖF-PSZH - Command vehicle for mechanized battalion staff chiefs and for reconnaissance platoon commanders, based on D-944 PSzH with additional radios and additional radio antenna on right hand side of the hull. It has one R-123 and one R-130 radio, plus two additional R-107 in the troop compartment.
 D-944.21 OPK-PSZH - Command vehicle for towed artillery battalion commanders with three R-123MT radios and artillery recce equipment (ET-68 laser-rangefinder in the turret in place of the KPVT gun, VOP recce instrument on the right side of the hull and others). The armament consisting only one PKT machine gun.

Former Czechoslovakia 
 OT-65 (Obrněný Transportér vz. 65) - Czechoslovak version of D-442 FÚG armoured scout car.
 OT-65ZDR (zdravotní) - OT-65 converted into an armoured ambulance.
 OT-65A "Vydra" (Otter) - OT-65 with a turret of the Czechoslovakian OT-62B TOPAS. The entry hatches have been moved so now they are positioned behind the turret. It also has additional protection on IR driving lights.
 OT-65Ch (chemický) - Variant with specialized radiation, chemical and biological detection devices as well as flag dispensers used to mark the contaminated areas.
 OT-65ChV (velitelsko-chemický) - Variant with specialized radiation, chemical and biological detection devices as well as flag dispensers used to mark the contaminated areas.
 OT-65DP - Armoured artillery forward observation post.
 OT-65DPP (pohyblivá dělostřelecká pozorovatelna) - Armoured artillery forward observation post.
 OT-65 R-2 - Communication vehicle with additional radio set R-2.
 OT-65 R-112 - Communication vehicle with additional radio set R-112.
 OT-65RL - Variant fitted with a battlefield surveillance radar PSNR-1.
 OT-65VP - FAC vehicle with additional radios. Similar to the Hungarian MRP-FÚG.
 OT-66 (Obrněný Transportér vz. 66) - Czechoslovak designation for D-944 PSzH.

Former East Germany 

 D-944.40 PSzH-IV - Hungarian export designation for APC's of the East-German border guards (Grenztruppen - GT). GT designator: SPW-PSH (Schützenpanzerwagen). The SPW-PSH was also found in some para-military units such as the Bereitschaftspolizei (riot police). Of the 692 SPW's delivered between 1970 and 1976, several were modified into new types by the "Panzerwerkstatt-2" from 1979:
 SPW-PSH (Ch) - modification of 12 existing vehicles into NBC reconnaissance vehicles with specialized radiation, chemical and biological detection devices as well as two flag dispensers used to mark the contaminated areas.
 SPW-PSH (Artl) - 39 PSH's were modified into reconnaissance vehicles for artillery units of the border troops. They had additional signals equipment (and three whip antennae at the rear hull) and an optical range finder OEM-2 that was transported in a big box on top of the engine deck.
 SPW-PSH (Pi) - 28 vehicles of the border troops were converted into combat engineer (Pionier) recce vehicles with a crew of 7 and equipped with portable mine detection systems MSG-46M, a chain saw PS-90, explosives etc.
 SPW-PSH-Agitprop - agitation and propaganda vehicle.
 D-944.41 PSzH-IV - Battalion commander's vehicle with telescopic mast HTM-10, GT designator SPW-PSH (K1).
 D-944.42 PSzH-IV - Company commander's vehicle, GT designator SPW-PSH (K2).
 PSzH-IV-10 - Turretless PSzH-IV used by the border guards.

Iraq 
 D-944.50 PSzH-IV - Hungarian export designation for APC's sold to Iraq.
 D-944.53 PSzH-IV - Hungarian export designation for company commander's vehicle sold to Iraq.

Operators

Current operators 
  - The remaining vehicles are mostly in stock (Check Hungary section for full list of used variants). PSzH was withdrawn from service, and hulls are in scarcely repairable condition.

Former operators 
 : 275 ordered in 1965 and received by 1968. Czechoslovak designation OT-65A Otter. Another 200 PSzH were also acquired and designated OT-66.
  - 50 PSzH.
  - 200 PSzH-IV received in 1981; probably replaced in service by the BRDM-2.
  - 100 OT-65A Otter.
 / - taken from GDR's army, all scrapped or sold to other countries.

References 

 Jackowski, Jerzy i Wysocki, Tadeusz. Kołowe środki transportu armii węgierskiej. Nowa Technika Wojskowa. 1993, issue 1, pages 7–9. ISSN 1230-1655.
 Janusz Magnuski "Wozy Bojowe LWP", Wydawnictwo MON, Warsaw 1985
 Global Security
 JED

See also 
"Combat Reconnaissance/Patrol Vehicle" with rear engine:
 ABC-79M
 BRDM-2
 Textron Tactical Armoured Patrol Vehicle
 RBY MK 1
 Fennek

Wheeled amphibious armoured fighting vehicles
Wheeled reconnaissance vehicles
Armoured fighting vehicles of Czechoslovakia
Armoured fighting vehicles of Hungary
Scout cars of the Cold War
Military vehicles introduced in the 1960s